Shake It Up is an album by smooth jazz musicians Boney James and Rick Braun, released in 2000.

Track listing

Personnel 
Musicians
 Boney James – tenor saxophone (1-8), keyboards (1, 6-9), Yamaha WX7 (8), alto saxophone (9), programming (9)
 Rick Braun – trumpet (1, 2, 4-8), flugelhorn (3, 9), keyboards (6)
 David "Kahlid" Woods – keyboards (1, 5), keyboard bass (1, 5), programming (1, 5)
 Phil Davis – Wurlitzer electric piano (2), keyboards (9)
 Larry Williams – strings (2)
 Darrell Smith – keyboards (3), keyboard bass (3), programming (3)
 Carl Burnett – keyboards (4), keyboard bass (4), programming (4), guitars (4)
 David Torkanowsky – acoustic piano (4, 5), keyboards (7)
 Paul Brown – programming (5), drum programming (7)
 Bob James – keyboards (6)
 Michael Egizi – keyboards (8), programming (8)
 Rohn Lawrence – guitars (2, 3, 7)
 Paul Jackson Jr. – guitars (5, 9)
 Larry Carlton – guitars (6)
 Bob DeFranco – guitars (8)
 Tony Maiden – guitars (8)
 Larry Kimpel – bass (2)
 Alex Al – bass (5, 7, 9)
 Nathan East – bass (6)
 Lil' John Roberts – drums (2, 5, 7)
 Gary Novak – drums (4)
 Harvey Mason – drums (6)
 Paulinho da Costa – percussion (2-9)
 Alex Brown – vocals (10)
 Sue Ann Carwell – vocals (10)
 Keturah Claiborne – vocals (10)
 Kristle Murden – vocals (10)
 Yvonne Williams – vocals (10)

Arrangements
 Boney James (1, 2, 6, 7, 9), vocal arrangements (10)
 Rick Braun (1, 2, 6, 7)
 Paul Brown (1, 2, 5, 6, 7), vocal arrangements (10)
 David "Kahlid" Woods (1, 5)
 Phil Davis (2)
 Darrell Smith (3)
 Carl Burnett (4)
 David Torkanowsky (7)
 Michael Egizi (8)
 Sue Ann Carwell – vocal arrangements (10)

Production 
 Boney James – producer 
 Paul Brown – producer, engineer, mixing (2, 9, 10)
 Rick Braun – co-producer (2, 6, 10)
 Dave Rideau – engineer 
 Bill Schnee – engineer, mixing (1, 3, 4, 5, 7, 8)
 Al Schmitt – mixing (6)
 Koji Egawa – Pro Tools editing
 Stephen Marcussen – mastering at A&M Mastering Studios (Hollywood, California)
 Lexy Shrayer – production coordinator 
 Vigon/Ellis – art direction, design 
 Horst Stasny – photography

References

2000 albums
Warner Records albums
Smooth jazz albums
Boney James albums
Rick Braun albums